Austrobuxus is a genus of plants under the family Picrodendraceae first described as a genus in 1861. It is native to Southeast Asia, Papuasia, and Australia. The region with the highest diversity is New Caledonia.

Species

formerly included
moved to other genera: Kairothamnus Longetia Scagea

References

Picrodendraceae
Malpighiales genera